Hassan Dalhat, (born December 31, 1936) at Kakaki quarters in the ancient city of Zaria. He is a Nigerian seasoned bureaucrat and administrator who served at the upper echelon of the Kaduna state civil service. He holds the traditional title of Cigarin Zazzau (The Conqueror) and District Head of Sabon Birnin Daji in Kaduna state. The 3rd and last child of late Hajiya Fatima Dalhatu (1905-1998) and the 7th to late Alkali Dalhatu Muhammad (1885-1956). His father was a respected and influential High Court Judge (Alkali) who had served at Anchau-Takalafiya and Makarfi in Kaduna state. After the death of Shehu Ladan (former GMD NNPC and first Cigarin Zazzau), the Emir of Zazzau, Alhaji (Dr) Shehu Idris honoured him with the prestigious title.  As District Head, he became a patron of both Western and Islamic education as a means to succeed in modern Nigeria. He is a people oriented leader who think less of himself and more of the less privileged. After the death of his father in 1956, his elder brother Alkali Bashir Dalhatu became his guardian, while the late Maccido Dalhat CON (1932-2012) became his mentor, confidant and buffer. Cigarin Zazzau is blessed with 3 wives and 10 children.

References
www.leadership.ng/nga/articles/18644/2012/03/09
africafocus.com/2012/03/09/tambuwal
Alhaji Shehu Idris, The 18th Emir of Zazzau
Zuriyar Mallam Ibrahim Tsoho dake Kakaki a cikin birnin Zaria, Na Dr Dogara Bashir.

Living people
1936 births
Nigerian politicians